The 1936 Arizona Wildcats football team represented the University of Arizona in the Border Conference during the 1936 college football season.  In their fourth season under head coach Tex Oliver, the Wildcats compiled a 5–2–3 record (3–0–1 against Border opponents), won the conference championship, and outscored their opponents, 190 to 54.  The team played its home games at Arizona Stadium in Tucson, Arizona.

Schedule

References

Arizona
Arizona Wildcats football seasons
Border Conference football champion seasons
Arizona Wildcats football